Kurt Gerron (11 May 1897 – 28 October 1944) was a German Jewish actor and film director. He and his wife, Olga were murdered in the Holocaust.

Life
Born Kurt Gerson into a well-off merchant family in Berlin, he studied medicine before being called up for military service in World War I. After being seriously wounded, he was qualified as a military doctor in the German Army, despite having been only in his second year at university. After the war Gerron turned to a stage career, becoming a theatre actor under director Max Reinhardt in 1920. He appeared in secondary roles in several silent films and began directing film shorts in 1926.

Gerron's popular cinema breakthrough came with The Blue Angel (Der Blaue Engel, 1930) opposite Marlene Dietrich. Two years before, Gerron originated the role of "Tiger" Brown in the 1928 premiere production of The Threepenny Opera (Die Dreigroschenoper) at the Berlin Theater am Schiffbauerdamm, in which he also performed the first public performance of the song, "Mack the Knife". With the show's international success, Gerron's name and recorded voice became well known across Europe.

Under the Nazis
After the 1933 seizure of power by the Nazis (known today as the Machtergreifung), Gerron left Nazi Germany with his wife and parents, traveling first to Paris and later to Amsterdam. He continued work there as an actor at the Stadsschouwburg and directed several movies. Several times he was offered employment in Hollywood through the agency of Peter Lorre and Josef von Sternberg, but Gerron refused to leave Europe.

After the Wehrmacht occupied the Netherlands, Gerron and his parents were first interned in the transit camp at Westerbork. His parents were deported on May 5th 1943 and murdered in Sobibor. Gerron and his wife were later sent to the Theresienstadt concentration camp. There he was forced by the SS to stage the cabaret review, Karussell, in which he reprised Mack the Knife, as well as compositions by Martin Roman and other imprisoned musicians and artists.

In 1944, Gerron was coerced into directing a Nazi propaganda film intended to be viewed in "neutral" nations such as Switzerland, Sweden, and Ireland, for example, showing how "humane" conditions were at Theresienstadt. Once filming was finished, Gerron and members of the Jazz pianist Martin Roman's Ghetto Swingers were deported on the camp's final train transport to Auschwitz, on 28 October.  Gerron and his wife were murdered in the gas chamber immediately upon arrival on 30 October 1944, along with the film's entire performing entourage (except for Roman and guitarist Coco Schumann). The next day, Reichsführer SS Heinrich Himmler ordered the closure of the gas chambers.

All known complete prints of Gerron's final film, which was to have been called Theresienstadt. Ein Dokumentarfilm aus dem jüdischen Siedlungsgebiet (Terezin: A Documentary Film of the Jewish Resettlement), and which is also referred to as Der Führer schenkt den Juden eine Stadt (The Führer Gives the Jews a City), were destroyed in 1945. Twenty minutes of footage were discovered in Czechoslovakia in the mid-1960s, and today the film exists only in fragmentary form.

On Friday June 17 2022 a Stolperstein for Kurt Gerron and one for his wife, Olga Gerson were installed at Paulsborner Strasse 77, Berlin, their last residence in Germany.

Selected filmography

 The Haunting of Castle Kitay (1920)
Varieté (1925)
 Semi-Silk (1925)
 Upstairs and Downstairs (1925)
 Oh Those Glorious Old Student Days (1925)
 White Slave Traffic (1926)
 The Three Mannequins (1926)
 Annemarie and Her Cavalryman (1926)
 Love's Joys and Woes (1926)
 Vienna - Berlin (1926)
 His Greatest Bluff (1927)
 Marie's Soldier (1927)
 The Bordello in Rio (1927)
 Dancing Vienna (1927)
 The Most Beautiful Legs of Berlin (1927)
 Benno Stehkragen (1927)
 Always Be True and Faithful (1927)
 Queen of the Boulevards (1927)
 Endangered Girls (1927)
 A Crazy Night (1927)
 A Serious Case (1927)
 The Lady with the Tiger Skin (1927)
 Break-in (1927)
 The Tragedy of a Lost Soul (1927)
 The White Spider (1927)
 Assassination (1927)
 The Transformation of Dr. Bessel (1927)
 The Duty to Remain Silent (1928)
 Casanova's Legacy (1928)
 Yacht of the Seven Sins (1928)
 Mariett Dances Today (1928)
 Life's Circus (1928)
 Under Suspicion (1928)
 Immorality (1928)
The White Hell of Pitz Palu (1929)
 Revolt in the Batchelor's House (1929)
 We Stick Together Through Thick and Thin (1929)
Diary of a Lost Girl (1929)
 Daughter of the Regiment (1929)
People on Sunday (1930)
 Burglars (1930)
 Fairground People (1930)
 Dolly Gets Ahead (1930)
 Love in the Ring (1930)
The Blue Angel (1930)
 The Three from the Filling Station (1930)
 Bombs on Monte Carlo (1931)
 My Wife, the Impostor (1931)
 Madame Pompadour (1931)
 Her Majesty the Barmaid (1931)
 A Night at the Grand Hotel (1931)
 Salto Mortale (1931)
 Road to Rio (1931)
 No Money Needed (1932)
 The White Demon (1932)
 Two in a Car (1932)
 Things Are Getting Better Already (1932)
 Narcotics (1932)
 A Mad Idea (1932)
 Today Is the Day (1933)
 Merijntje Gijzens Jeugd (Netherlands, 1936)
 The Three Wishes (Netherlands, 1937)
 The Three Wishes (Italy, 1937)

Documentaries about Gerron
Gerron is the subject of three documentary films, Prisoner of Paradise (PBS), Kurt Gerrons Karussell, and Tracks to Terezín, which features Holocaust survivor Herbert Thomas Mandl talking about Kurt Gerron as the director of the film Theresienstadt. Ein Dokumentarfilm aus dem jüdischen Siedlungsgebiet. The narrator in Kurt Gerrons Karussell, which stars Ute Lemper, is Roy Kift, who has also written a play on Gerron's time in Theresienstadt entitled Camp Comedy. The play is published in The Theatre of the Holocaust, edited by Professor Robert Skloot and published by the University of Wisconsin Press.

References
 "Prisoner of Paradise" by PBS, 2003, 100 mins, not rated.
Fictional biography by Charles Lewinsky (Swiss, in German) Gerron, 2011, French translation Retour indésirable, Grasset, 2013.

External links
 
 Photographs of Kurt Gerron
  Availability for educational use of "The Fuehrer Gives the Jews a City"

1897 births
1944 deaths
People from Mitte
German male stage actors
German male film actors
German male silent film actors
Jewish German male actors
German people who died in Auschwitz concentration camp
German civilians killed in World War II
Theresienstadt Ghetto prisoners
20th-century German male actors
Male actors from Berlin
People killed by gas chamber by Nazi Germany
Film directors from Berlin
German Jews who died in the Holocaust
Jewish writers
Ghetto Swingers members
German people executed in Nazi concentration camps
German Jewish military personnel of World War I